Magheraghanrush Court Tomb is a court cairn and National Monument located in County Sligo, Ireland.

Location

History
Magheraghanrush Court Tomb was built c. 3000 BC. It may have first been a simple construction with U-shaped court; the east part was added later.

Local legend has it as a Giant's Grave or Druid's Altar, or the burial site of Eógan Bél (d. AD 542), King of Connacht, although the Middle Irish poem Caithréim Cellaig says he was buried on Knocknarea and reburied on an island in Lough Gill.

Animal and human bones were discovered on the site as well as a flint flake.

Description
The tomb is very large, 30 m (100 ft) long. The court is oval and located in the centre with two chambers at one end and a single chamber at the other, giving it the appearance of a man from above. The central court is not a perfect oval but is crooked in the middle, indicating that there was originally one court cairn which was then added to. Some of the uprights had lintels, giving it the name of "the Irish Stonehenge."

References

National Monuments in County Sligo
Archaeological sites in County Sligo
Tombs in the Republic of Ireland